George Perry (7 Oct 1818 – 9 Jan 1891) was an Ontario political figure. He represented Oxford North in the Legislative Assembly of Ontario as a Liberal member from 1867 to 1872.

Perry was a teacher and also served as reeve of Blenheim Township. He gave up his seat in 1872 to allow Oliver Mowat to sit in the legislature. He later served as sheriff for Oxford County.

Perry Township in Parry Sound District, Ontario was named after him.

External links

1818 births
1891 deaths
Ontario Liberal Party MPPs